After the 2010 Haiti earthquake, the United States enabled a Temporary Protected Status (TPS) for Haitians currently residing in and those that would take refuge in the United States within a year of the earthquake. This would allow Haitians protection from the instability Haiti experienced due to the earthquake. However, Haitians that did not meet the requirements for the TPS or had committed one felony/two misdemeanors, were deported. These deportations have been continuous for the last decade.

2010 earthquake and beginning of TPS 

A 7.0 earthquake hit Léogâne, Haiti on January 12, 2010, causing damage to about 80-90% of the city's buildings. Many other cities were destroyed and over 100,000 were killed. This caused an influx of Haitian immigrants, mostly to Florida and New York.

In 2010, the United States granted Temporary Protected Status (TPS) for Haitians currently living in the United States after the earthquake. This allowed Haitians currently residing in the United States without legal residency and Haitian immigrants within a year of the earthquake to continue living there as refugees. Haiti was deemed unsafe and improper for Haitians to return to, and unable to support the return of these immigrants. However, the TPS only included Haitians without a certain criminal record, one felony or two misdemeanors. Over time, many of these eligible Haitians were deported from the United States.

Many Haitians living outside of Haiti experienced transnationalism, and worked in the United States to send remittances to their families in Haiti.

Criminal deportation 2010-2015 

Between 2010 and 2015, the five years after the earthquake, deportations to Haiti on criminal offenses began. Over 1,500 men and women were deported to Haiti due to a criminal history. Within the first year after the 2010 Haiti earthquake, criminal deportations to Haiti began. Many of those deported were lawful permanent residents who had lived in the United States for years, leaving behind family members and children. Some later died. In response, the United States halted deportations but then began again after two months.

Resumption of removals to Haiti after the earthquake 
In 2016, six years after the earthquake, the United States began removing undocumented Haitians unprotected by TPS (temporary protected status), and deported them back to Haiti. About 600 Haitians were deported in 2016. In 2017, efforts to end TPS by the national government and the Trump administration began and about 5,500 Haitian refugees were deported. In November 2018, the Trump administration announced that the temporary protection status program would be ending for the approximate 60,000 Haitians that were currently protected by this status and had not yet gained residency. The United States Immigration and Customs Enforcement (ICE) began to detain thousands of Haitians and deport them to Haiti.

Policies under the Trump administration 

In 2017, the Trump administration decided to end the Temporary Protection Status (TPS) for all Haitians in the United States. He ceased the Haitian TPS because it had gone on too long and was becoming permanent rather than temporary as it was anticipated to be. The termination was said to take effect in July 2019, eighteen months later, to create a smooth transition for Haiti, the United States, and the Haitian Immigrants previously under TPS. Various officials agreed that it was a good decision, however it was considerably controversial both nationally and abroad.

After this news was released, many politicians and experts expressed strong opinions opposing the termination of the Haitian Temporary Protection Status, including Jessicah Pierre, Bill Nelson, and Ileana Ros-Lehtinen. They argued that the status of Haiti was still not safe for its refugees to return home. Recently, members of the United States Congress have introduced a Haitian Deportation Relief Act suggesting the suspension of Haitian deportation due to the recent outbreak of the COVID-19 pandemic. Congresspeople including Frederica Wilson, Bennie Thompson, Eliot Engel, and others, believed Haiti to be significantly more unfit to support a large number of deportees during these times.

As required by the orders in Saget v. Trump and Ramos v. Nielsen, the Temporary Protected Status designation for Haiti remained in effect pending further court order. Beneficiaries under the TPS designation for Haiti will maintain their status. The department of United States Citizenship and Immigration Services automatically extended TPS documents through January 4, 2021.

Policies under the Biden administration
In September 2021, a group of approximately 15,000 migrants, about 95% of whom were Haitian, resided in a camp under a bridge between Del Rio, Texas and Mexico. On September 24, 2021, United States Secretary of Homeland Security Alejandro Mayorkas stated that approximately 2,000 had been deported to Haiti on 17 flights, while 5,000 were awaiting processing by Homeland Security agents, and approximately 8,000 had returned to Mexico. Thousands were freed inside the U.S. to await immigration hearings, with some 2,000 released in Houston alone, contradicting the administration's statement that Haitians entering illegally were subject to immediate deportation. By the morning of September 24, 2021, all migrants had been removed from the camp near Del Rio.

On September 23, 2021, United States Special Envoy for Haiti Daniel Lewis Foote resigned in protest of the Biden administration's policies regarding Haitian deportations, stating that "armed gangs" had made Haiti so dangerous that US officials were "confined to secure compounds".

References 

Haitian people
United States immigration and naturalization case law
Trump administration controversies
Biden administration controversies
Haiti–United States relations
Post–civil rights era in African-American history